Montorsaio is a village in Tuscany, central Italy,  administratively a frazione of the comune of Campagnatico, province of Grosseto. At the time of the 2001 census its population amounted to 167.

Montorsaio is about 20 km from Grosseto and 11 km from Campagnatico, and it is situated on a hill above the Ombrone river.

Main sights 
 Church of Santi Cerbone e Michele (12th century), main parish church of the village
 Church of Santissimo Crocifisso, ancient church re-built in the 20th century
 Convent of San Benedetto alla Nave (14th century), now transformed into a farmhouse
 Walls of Montorsaio, old fortifications which surround the village since the 12th century
 Cassero Senese, a 13th-century fortress

References

Bibliography 
 Aldo Mazzolai, Guida della Maremma. Percorsi tra arte e natura, Le Lettere, Florence, 1997
 Giuseppe Guerrini, Torri e castelli della Provincia di Grosseto, Nuova Immagine Editrice, Siena, 1999

See also 
 Arcille
 Campagnatico
 Marrucheti

Frazioni of Campagnatico